Roy-Charles A. Coulombe  (born November 8, 1960), known as Charles Coulombe, is an American Catholic author, historian, and lecturer. Coulombe is known for his advocacy of monarchism.

Early life and education 

Coulombe was born in Manhattan on November 8, 1960 to his French-Canadian father, Guy J.C. Coulombe  and  mother Patricia Coulombe. Due to their acting careers they moved to Hollywood, California. Coulombe attended college at the New Mexico Military Institute and then at California State University, Northridge, choosing to major in political science.

As of June 2021, he studied at the International Theological Institute in Austria.

Career 
In 1987, Coulombe authored his first book, Everyman Today Call Rome, a look at the Catholic Church in America from a viewpoint of the newer generation. In 1990, some of Coulombe's poetry was published in The White Cockade. Coulombe's work has appeared in multiple journals, including Fidelity of Australia, and PRAG of London. Coulombe has also been an editor and movie reviewer to the National Catholic Register, and a contributor to publications as the Catholic Herald, Success, Catholic Twin Circle, and FATE. He is also an author with publications such as the European Conservative and has been interviewed by Vulture.
 
Coulombe was commended by Pope John Paul II for his book Vicars of Christ: A History of the Popes, and by order of John Paul II, Coulombe was created a Knight Commander of the Order of St. Sylvester for his services rendered to the Holy See. He has later on also provided narration for ABC News, Fox News, and for the BBC during the funeral of John Paul II and the election and installation of Pope Benedict XVI. Coulombe had also been awarded the Christian Law Institute's Christ King Journalism Award in 1992.

Politics 
Coulombe is a Traditionalist Catholic. He served as the Western U.S. Delegate to the Grand Council of International Monarchist League and is a member of the Catholic Writer's Guild of Great Britain, the Royal Stuart Society, and the Knights of Peter Claver. Coulombe is a founding board member of the Queen of Angels Foundation, a Roman Catholic devotional society based in Los Angeles.

In 1995, Coulombe as a representative of the International Monarchist League met Mwami Kigeli V in Southern California.

Coulombe supports the American Solidarity Party and argued against the first impeachment of Donald Trump.

Bibliography

Books 
 Coulombe, Charles A., ed. The Muse in the Bottle: Great Writers on the Joys of Drinking, New York, Citadel Press, 2002. 
 —, ed., Classic Horror Stories: Sixteen Legendary Stories of the Supernatural, Guilford, Lyons Press, 2003. 
 Haunted Castles of the World: Ghostly Legends and Phenomena from Keeps and Fortresses Around the Globe, Guilford, Conn., Lyons Press, 2004. 
 Haunted Places in America: A Guide to Spooked and Spooky Public Places in the United States, Guilford, Conn., Lyons Press, 2004. 
 Rum: The Epic Story of the Drink That Conquered the World, Citadel, 2004. 
 The Pope's Legion: The Multinational Fighting Force that Defended the Vatican, New York, Palgrave Macmillan, 2008. 
 Puritan's Empire, Tumblar House, 2008. 
 Desire & Deception, Tumblar House, 2009. 
 The White Cockade: Catholic Poetry and Verse, Tumblar House, 2009. 
 Everyman Today Call Rome, Tumblar House, 2011. 
 Vicars of Christ, Tumblar House, 2014. 
 Star-Spangled Crown, Tumblar House, 2016. 
 A Catholic Quest for the Holy Grail, Charlotte, NC, TAN Books, 2017. 
 Blessed Charles of Austria: A Holy Emperor and His Legacy, TAN Books, 2020.

References

External links

 Charles A. Coulombe on Tumblar House
 
 

Living people
1960 births
American Christian democrats
American monarchists
California State University, Northridge alumni
Writers from Los Angeles
21st-century American poets
Roman Catholic religious educators
American traditionalist Catholics
Traditionalist Catholic writers
American emigrants to Austria
Knights of Peter Claver & Ladies Auxiliary
American people of French-Canadian descent